Hatting is a town in Horsens Municipality, Denmark, with a population of 1,823 (1 January 2022).

Notable people 
 Bodil Kjær (born 1932 in Hatting) a Danish architect, furniture designer, professor and researcher, who has specialized in interior design and city planning
 Kristian Kjærlund (born 1966 in Hatting) a Danish singer, won X Factor (Danish season 12)

References

Cities and towns in the Central Denmark Region
Horsens Municipality